The 1894 Olivet football team was an American football team that represented Olivet College in the Michigan Intercollegiate Athletic Association during the 1894 college football season. The team compiled a 1–3 record.

Schedule

References

Olivet
Olivet Comets football seasons
Olivet football